James Ananich (born September 20, 1975) is an American politician from the State of Michigan. He is a Democratic Party member of the Michigan State Senate representing the 27th district, which is located in Genesee County and includes the cities Burton, Clio, Flint, Mount Morris and Swartz Creek and the townships of Flint Township, Forest, Genesee, Mount Morris, Richfield, Thetford and Vienna.

Early life
James "Jim" Ananich was born to James and Susan Ananich as their only child. They raised him in Flint. His father was Flint City Ombudsman. In 1986, Jim's mother died. Thus the following year his father resigned as ombudsman to teach policy science at University of Michigan-Flint. He attend Flint Central where he played basketball and tennis.

Ananich attended and graduated in 1998 from Michigan State University with a bachelor's degree in political science and economics and a secondary teaching certificate in social studies. He also received a master's degree in Public Administration-Educational Administration from the University of Michigan-Flint.

At Michigan State he joined the College Democrats. In 1998, he interned with the Michigan Democratic Party then went to work for Senate Minority Leader John Cherry.

From 1998 to 2001, he worked for U.S. Rep. Dale Kildee, D-Flint. Until 2000, Ananich worked in Kildee's Washington, DC office. In 2000, his dad died thus he returned to Flint and worked out of Kildee's district office. After his 2004 primary loss, he worked for Bob Emerson.

Ananich met Andrea Abdella at the voting booth. Jim and Andrea were wed on November 8, 2003.

He then became a teacher in the Carman-Ainsworth and Flint Community School Districts from 2005 to 2009 teaching social studies. He was later employed by Priority Children as an education coordinator until 2011.

Political career
Ananich served on the Flint City Council from November 8, 2005 to November 9, 2009. He ran against Lee Gonzales for Michigan State Representative in the 2004 Democratic primary and lost. The next year, he was elected to Flint City Council and serve until 2009. On November 10, 2008, Ananich was selected by the council to be their president replacing Carolyn Sims. Ananich was succeeded as Council President by Delrico Loyd and as Member from the 7th ward by Dale Weighill. He then ran for State Representative in 2010 winning against Allan Pool 67% to 33%, succeeding Gonzales.

Ananich was unopposed in the Democratic primary on August 7, 2012 in his run for reelection, which he won on November 6 with nearly 74 percent of the votes. He introduced a bill on February 5, 2013 to correct a law regarding the abuse of vulnerable adults changing how prosecuting attorneys prove their case and was signed into law on June 4, 2013.

In 2013, with a vacancy due to John J. Gleason's resignation from the 27 District State Senate seat, he won election to the position on May 7. He introduced on October 23 a drive-by shooting incidents law that increased penalties which was passed and signed into law July 16, 2014. His scrap metal bill was signed into law on December 31. Ananich faced no opposition in the Democratic primary election on August 5, 2014. The Democratic State Senate caucus on November 6, 2014 selected Ananich to be the upcoming Senate Minority Leader.

Issues

The Flint Water Crisis
Shortly into his tenure as Senator, the Flint Water Crisis enfolded over the course of several months and drew national attention to the Flint. On January 13, 2016, Ananich called for the state to refund the $2 million to the city; Ananich also requested further emergency funding from the state and a commitment to long-term funding to address the effects of the lead contamination. Senator Ananich also sharply criticized the role emergency managers played in worsening the crisis and that the law allowing the positions should be reviewed and repealed. "It's been a failed project," he said. "There's absolutely no accountability with the government. They are trying to circumvent local democracy and say, 'This one individual knows best.'" On January 20, 2016 Senator Ananich introduced Senate Resolution 0133 (2016) that would grant state lawmakers probing the Flint water crisis subpoena power over the Governor's office, which is immune to the state Freedom of Information Act.

On February 23, 2016, the Michigan State Legislature started a committee to investigate the crisis chaired by Representative Jim Stamas and named Ananich as co-vice-chair along with Representative Ed McBroom.

Cryptocurrency 
Ananich is a supporter of cryptocurrencies and stated that he wants to make Michigan the most pro-Bitcoin state in the country in 2022.

Elections

References

External links
 Official Senate Profile
 Campaign website

1975 births
Living people
21st-century American politicians
Flint Central High School alumni
Democratic Party members of the Michigan House of Representatives
Michigan city council members
Democratic Party Michigan state senators
Michigan State University alumni
Politicians from Flint, Michigan
University of Michigan–Flint alumni